Raphionacme is a plant genus in the family Apocynaceae, first described as a genus in 1842. The genus is found primarily in Africa, with one species on the Arabian Peninsula.

Species
Species

formerly included
transferred to other genera (Buckollia, Chlorocyathus, Schlechterella )

Gallery

Flowers

Fruits

Caudex/tuber

References

Apocynaceae genera
Periplocoideae